Lake Shore Drive Bridge may refer to:
Lake Shore Drive Bridge (Michigan), a pedestrian bridge in Eagle River, Michigan
Lakeshore Drive Bridge, a bridge in North Little Rock, Arkansas
Outer Drive Bridge, a bridge that carries Lake Shore Drive in Chicago, Illinois